Batu Pahat Municipal Council (MPBP; , Jawi: مجليس ڤربندرن باتو ڤاهت) is a local authority which administrates West Batu Pahat District in Johor, Malaysia. This agency is under Johor state government. MPBP are responsible for public health and sanitation, waste removal and management, town planning, environmental protection and building control, social and economic development and general maintenance functions of urban infrastructure. The MPBP main headquarters is located at Jalan Pejabat, Bandar Penggaram, Batu Pahat.

History 

Formerly known as Batu Pahat West District Council (MDBPB). This agency was granted municipal status on 1 January 2001. At that time the total population within its jurisdiction was 350,000 and in 2007 is estimated to be well over 450,000 making it as the 12th largest city in Malaysia in terms of population in year 2008. In 2006, Bandar Penggaram, Batu Pahat surpassed Muar town to become the second-largest city in Johor state.

As of 2019, YB Datuk Mohd Rashid Hasnon (member parliament of Batu Pahat) said that Batu Pahat has its potential to achieve city status (Majlis Bandaraya) soon as long as fulfill all required upgrading criteria.

Administration areas 

Majlis Perbandaran Batu Pahat is the local government of:

 North zone in Batu Pahat city:

Taman Peserai, 
Peserai, 
Kampung Muhibbah, 
Simpang Lima, 
Parit Besar (Bagan) 峇眼, 
Semerah

 South zone in Batu Pahat city:

Taman Kemajuan, 
Taman Mewah 美华花园, 
Taman Kenanangan, 
Taman Bahagia, 
Taman Bukit Mutiara 伏龙山庄, 
Taman Bukit Mutiara 2 伏龙山庄二, 
Taman Flora Height 梅花高原, 
Taman Bandar, 
Taman Bukit Banang, 
Ayam Suloh, 
Senggarang, 
Rengit

 Center Zone in Batu Pahat city:

Taman Pegawai, 
Kampung Merdeka 周来村 (in Hokkien:Jiu1 Lai1), 
Taman Limpoon 林份花园, 
Taman Dato Abdul Rahman, 
Taman Batu Pahat 峇株巴辖花园, 
Taman Sejahtera, 
Taman Damai, 
Taman Damai 2, 
Taman Emas, 
Taman Emas 2 万豪苑, 
Taman Bukit Perdana 龙华山庄, 
Taman Bukit Perdana 2 龙华山庄二, 
Taman Perdana 红山, 
Taman Inang, 
Bandar Penggaram, Batu Pahat 峇株巴辖市中心

 East Zone in Batu Pahat city:

Taman Banang, 
Taman Bukit Pasir, 
Taman Setia Jaya 金宝花园, 
Taman Setia Jaya 2 金宝二镇, 
Taman Maju 进步花园, 
Taman Tasek, 
Taman Puteri, 
Taman Puteri Indah, 
Taman Flora Utama 富贵城, 
Taman Koperasi Bahagia 幸福合作社, 
Taman Flora 梅花岭, 
Parit Besar 大巴力 (in Hokkien:Du-a3 Ba1 Lik4), 
Taman Pelangi, 
Taman Berlian 健家园, 
Taman Gembira, 
Kampung Istana 三春村 (in Hokkien:Sam1 Chun1), 
Hill View Apartment 翠林轩, 
Taman Budaya, 
Taman Sentosa 圣陶沙花园, 
Pura Kencana, Sri Gading, 
Sri Gading, 
Bandar Universiti, Parit Raja, 
Universiti Tun Hussien Onn Malaysia (UTHM), 
Parit Raja

 West Zone in Batu Pahat city:

Taman Banang Ria, 
Banang Height, 
Taman Ampang Jaya, 
Taman Ampuan 安邦花园, 
Taman Joseph, 
Taman Sri Pantai 金宝苑, 
Taman Pantai 班底花园, 
Taman Pantai Baru 新班底花园, 
Taman Masjid Tanah, 
Taman Dagang, 
Taman Zamrud, 
Taman Soga 苏雅花园, 
Taman Soga 2, 
Kampung Satey, 
Kampung Petani, 
Sungai Suloh, 
Kampung Minyak Beku, 
Perigi Batu Pahat

See also 
 Cities of Malaysia
 Batu Pahat

References

Batu Pahat District
Batu Pahat
Municipal councils in Malaysia